Lord Kinloss is a title in the Peerage of Scotland. It was created in 1602 for Edward Bruce, later Master of the Rolls, with remainder to his heirs and assigns whatsoever. In 1604 he was also made Lord Bruce of Kinloss, with remainder to his heirs male, and in 1608 Lord Bruce of Kinloss, with remainder to any of his heirs. He was succeeded by his son, the second Lord, who was killed in a duel in 1613.

His younger brother, the third Lord, was created Earl of Elgin and Lord Bruce of Kinloss (a third separate barony) in 1633, with remainder to heirs male whatsoever, bearing the name and arms of Bruce. In 1641 he was also created Baron Bruce (designated "of Whorlton in the County of York") in the Peerage of England. He was succeeded by his son, the second Earl. He was created Baron Bruce of Skelton, Viscount Bruce and Earl of Ailesbury in the Peerage of England in 1664.

His grandson, the fourth Earl of Elgin, was the last male descendant of the first Lord Kinloss and had no male heirs of his own. He therefore chose as his heir his nephew the Hon. Thomas Brudenell, fourth son of George Brudenell, 3rd Earl of Cardigan. In 1746 he was given the additional title of Baron Bruce (designated "of Tottenham in the County of Wilts") with remainder to the Hon. Thomas. On his death in 1747 the earldom of Ailesbury, viscountcy of Bruce, Whorlton barony Bruce, and barony of Bruce of Skelton became extinct. The rest of his titles took three different lines of descent. He was succeeded in the three lordships of Bruce of Kinloss and the earldom of Elgin by his kinsman the ninth Earl of Kincardine (see Earl of Elgin and Earl of Kincardine for later history of these peerages). The Tottenham barony of Bruce passed according to the special remainder to his nephew Thomas, the second Baron. (The Earldom of Ailesbury was created anew for Thomas; see the Marquess of Ailesbury for later history of these titles).

The status of the lordship of Kinloss became uncertain. However, in 1868 the Committee for Privileges of the House of Lords decided that the rightful heir to the title was James Brydges, 3rd Duke of Chandos, as the son of Lady Mary Bruce, daughter of the fourth Earl of Elgin. However, he never assumed the title. On the death of the Duke, the dukedom became extinct.

The heir to the lordship of Kinloss was his only child, Anne, Duchess of Buckingham and Chandos and de jure eighth Lady Kinloss, the wife of Richard Temple-Grenville, 1st Duke of Buckingham and Chandos. In 1868 her grandson, Richard Temple-Grenville, 3rd Duke of Buckingham and Chandos, established his right to the lordship before the Committee for Privileges of the House of Lords, and became the tenth Lord Kinloss. On his death in 1889 the dukedom became extinct, while the lordship passed to his eldest daughter Mary.  the title is held by the latter's great-granddaughter, the thirteenth Lady, who succeeded her mother in 2012.

The family seat is North View House, near Sheriff Hutton, North Yorkshire.

Lords Kinloss (1602)
Edward Bruce, 1st Lord Kinloss (1548–1611)
Edward Bruce, 2nd Lord Kinloss (1594–1613)
Thomas Bruce, 1st Earl of Elgin, 3rd Lord Kinloss (1599–1663)
Robert Bruce, 2nd Earl of Elgin, 1st Earl of Ailesbury, 4th Lord Kinloss (1627–1685)
Thomas Bruce, 3rd Earl of Elgin, 2nd Earl of Ailesbury, 5th Lord Kinloss (1656–1741)
Charles Bruce, 4th Earl of Elgin, 6th Lord Kinloss (1682–1747)
James Brydges, 3rd Duke of Chandos, de jure 7th Lord Kinloss (1731–1789)
Anne Elizabeth Temple-Nugent-Brydges-Chandos-Grenville, de jure 8th Lady Kinloss (1779–1836)
Richard Plantagenet Temple-Nugent-Brydges-Chandos-Grenville, 2nd Duke of Buckingham and Chandos, de jure 9th Lord Kinloss (1797–1861)
Richard Plantagenet Campbell Temple-Nugent-Brydges-Chandos-Grenville, 3rd Duke of Buckingham and Chandos, 10th Lord Kinloss (1823–1889)
Mary Morgan-Grenville, 11th Lady Kinloss (1852–1944)
(Beatrice) Mary Grenville Freeman-Grenville, 12th Lady Kinloss (1922–2012)
Teresa Mary Nugent Freeman-Grenville, 13th Lady Kinloss (b. 1957)

The heir presumptive is the present holder's sister, the Hon. Hester Josephine Anne Freeman-Grenville, Mistress of Kinloss (b. 1960)
The heir presumptive's heir apparent is her son Joseph Anthony Haworth (b. 1985)
The heir presumptive’s heir apparent’s heir apparent is his son, Angus Christopher Temple-Nugent Bridges Chandos Haworth (b. 2018)

See also
Earl of Elgin
Earl of Kincardine
Marquess of Ailesbury
Duke of Chandos
Duke of Buckingham and Chandos

References

www.cracroftspeerage.co.uk

Lordships of Parliament
Grenville family
Noble titles created in 1602